The 1890 Iowa Hawkeyes football team represented the University of Iowa during the 1890 college football season. Following Iowa's inaugural season in 1889, two games were scheduled for the Hawkeyes to play in 1890. On October 18, the Hawkeyes played Iowa College in Iowa City, only to lose to the Pioneers for the second time in two games. It was this loss that triggered a dispute amongst people within the University. In an attempt to prove that the best football talent was not on the team, the S.U.I. Medics challenged the varsity squad to a game. Confident, the varsity squad accepted, and lost, 22–10. But the loss did not keep Iowa from challenging Iowa Wesleyan, who accepted, under the terms that the game be played in Mount Pleasant, Iowa.

Fifteen hundred fans, including John Marshall Harlan and Robert Todd Lincoln, were in attendance for the Thanksgiving Day game. Using rules that made touchdowns worth four points, the Hawkeyes easily won the game in a rout, 91–0. The Hawkeyes scored 19 touchdowns and five goals after touchdown while A.G. Smith kicked the first field goal in school history.
Today, the game still stands as Iowa's third-largest margin of victory in school history.

Schedule

† Did not count against Iowa's record.

References

 MacCambridge, M. (2005) ESPN College Football Encyclopedia. New York: ESPN Books. .
 Lamb, D. and McGrane, B. (1964) 75 Years with the Fighting Hawkeyes. WM. C. Brown Company. 

Iowa
Iowa Hawkeyes football seasons
Iowa Hawkeyes football